The Wahpeton Micropolitan Statistical Area, as defined by the United States Census Bureau, is an area consisting of two counties – one in southeast North Dakota and one in west central Minnesota, anchored by the city of Wahpeton, North Dakota. As of the 2010 census, the μSA had a population of 22,897.

The Wahpeton Micropolitan Statistical Area is a component of the Fargo–Wahpeton, ND-MN Combined Statistical Area.

Counties
Richland County, North Dakota
Wilkin County, Minnesota

Communities
Places with more than 5,000 inhabitants
Wahpeton, North Dakota
Places with 1,000 to 5,000 inhabitants
Breckenridge, Minnesota
Places with 500 to 1,000 inhabitants
Hankinson, North Dakota
Lidgerwood, North Dakota
Wyndmere, North Dakota
Places with 100 to 500 inhabitants
Abercrombie, North Dakota
Campbell, Minnesota
Christine, North Dakota
Colfax, North Dakota
Fairmount, North Dakota
Foxhome, Minnesota
Great Bend, North Dakota
Mooreton, North Dakota
Rothsay, Minnesota
Walcott, North Dakota
Wolverton, Minnesota
Places with less than 100 inhabitants
Barney, North Dakota
Doran, Minnesota
Dwight, North Dakota
Kent, Minnesota
Mantador, North Dakota
Nashua, Minnesota
Tenney, Minnesota

Townships

Richland County

Wilkin County

Demographics

As of the census of 2000, there were 25,136 people, 9,437 households, and 6,353 families residing within the μSA. The racial makeup of the μSA was 97.10% White, 0.29% African American, 1.31% Native American, 0.22% Asian, 0.03% Pacific Islander, 0.24% from other races, and 0.82% from two or more races. Hispanic or Latino of any race were 0.93% of the population.

The median income for a household in the μSA was $37,096, and the median income for a family was $45,852. Males had a median income of $31,051 versus $20,618 for females. The per capita income for the μSA was $16,606.

See also
North Dakota census statistical areas
Minnesota census statistical areas

References